Thulani Caleb Serero (born 11 April 1990) is a South African soccer player who plays as a midfielder for Al Jazira and the South African national team. Prior to joining Al Jazira, he played for Ajax Cape Town in the South African Premier Soccer League, and Ajax and Vitesse in the Dutch Eredivisie.

Club career

Ajax Cape Town
Born in Mapetla, Soweto, Serero is a product of the Ajax Cape Town's youth academy having been promoted to the first team in 2008, making his debut under then head coach Craig Rosslee. He made a total of 11 appearances in the regular 2008–09 PSL season, and managed to score four times, helping his side to a 7th-place finish by the end of the season. The following season saw Serero become the first choice playmaker at the Cape club, making a total of 25 appearances during the regular season, and scoring twice. Ajax CT would finish in 7th place again that season, with Serero gaining much attention from the local media for his performances on the pitch.

During the 2010–11 season, under Foppe de Haan, Serero helped the Cape side to a second place regular season finish scoring 11 league goals, and helped his team to reach the finals of the Telkom Knockout tournament. At the end of the season he was awarded a number of accolades, including PSL Footballer of the Year, PSL Player of the Season, PSL Players' Player of the Season and the ABSA Premiership Red Hot Young Player award. On 22 May 2011, he was signed by AFC Ajax for €2.5 million.

AFC Ajax
Serero had had several trials with parent club AFC Ajax in the preceding years. On 22 May 2011 it was announced that he had signed a four-year contract with Ajax and he stated it was 'a dream come true'. He made his debut for Ajax on 7 August 2011 coming on as a substitute player in the match against De Graafschap. He only played in a total of 6 matches in his first season with Ajax due to an injury. He scored his first goal for AFC Ajax in the home win against NAC Breda on 25 August 2012. Two weeks later he scored two goals against SC Heerenveen, receiving a red card and being sent off in the same match. On 1 September 2013 Serero made his debut in the starting 11 of Ajax, replacing Christian Eriksen who had just left for Tottenham Hotspur, playing in the midfield.

On 5 August 2013 he made his debut in the Eerste Divisie, playing for the reserves team Jong Ajax, who had recently been promoted. The match ended in a 2–0 victory against Telstar. On 26 November 2013 he scored his first international goal for Ajax in the UEFA Champions League, when he scored the opener of a 2–1 win at home against FC Barcelona in the 19th minute.

In March 2015, he was associated with a move to AC Milan.

His contract at Ajax was not renewed making him a free agent at the end of June 2017.

Vitesse
On 14 June 2017, fellow Eredivisie club Vitesse announced the signing of Serero on a three-year deal.

International career
Serero has played for the South Africa U-20 team. He earned his first cap for South Africa on 9 February 2011. He came on as a second-half substitute in a friendly against Kenya. He scored his first Bafana Bafana goal against Swaziland in a non-friendly match ahead of the 2010 FIFA World Cup.

He was released from the national team squad due to disciplinary reasons the day before their 2014 World Cup qualification group match against Botswana on 7 September 2013. According to Gordon Igesund, Serero had allegedly stated to the team doctor that he did not want to play in the match in order to avoid risking an injury ahead of an upcoming UEFA Champions League game for his club. Serero disputed these claims, stating that he was genuinely injured and therefore wary about participating in the game.

On 15 November 2014, Serero scored his first goal for the South African senior team in a 2015 Africa Cup of Nations qualification match against Sudan, scoring in the 37th minute of the 2–1 win at home, thus helping his team secure a berth in the final tournament held in Equatorial Guinea the next year.

Having contributed to his team's placement for the final tournament, Serero was cut from the 23-man selection to represent South Africa in the final tournament under head coach Ephraim Mashaba, having been called up for the 34-man provisional squad prior.

He was recalled to the national team in November 2018.

Career statistics

International goals 
Scores and results list South Africa's goal tally first.

Honours
Ajax Cape Town
MTN 8 runner-up: 2009
Telkom Knockout runner-up: 2010

Ajax
Eredivisie: 2011–12, 2012–13, 2013–14
Johan Cruijff Shield: 2013

Al Jazira
UAE Pro League: 2020–21
Individual
 PSL Footballer of the Year: 2011
 PSL Player of the Season: 2011
 PSL Players' Player of the Season: 2011
 Absa Premiership Red Hot Young Player in Premier Soccer League: 2011
 SAFA Young Player of the Year: 2009

References

External links
 

1990 births
South African soccer players
Living people
Association football midfielders
Sportspeople from Soweto
Association football forwards
South Africa international soccer players
Cape Town Spurs F.C. players
AFC Ajax players
Jong Ajax players
SBV Vitesse players
Al Jazira Club players
2013 Africa Cup of Nations players
Eredivisie players
Eerste Divisie players
UAE Pro League players
South African expatriate soccer players
South African expatriate sportspeople in the Netherlands
South African expatriate sportspeople in the United Arab Emirates
Expatriate footballers in the Netherlands
Expatriate footballers in the United Arab Emirates
2019 Africa Cup of Nations players